Škovec ( or ) is a small settlement south of Tržišče in the Municipality of Sevnica in east-central Slovenia. The area is part of the traditional region of Lower Carniola and is now included in the Lower Sava Statistical Region.

References

External links
Škovec at Geopedia

Populated places in the Municipality of Sevnica